Delbrück is a town in the east of North Rhine-Westphalia, Germany, located in the district Paderborn.

History

The first document mentioning the town dates to 1219. In 1410, the town was destroyed by fire during a conflict between the bishop of Paderborn and the bishop of Cologne.

Subdivisions

Mayors
 Robert Oelsmeier (CSU): 1999–2009
 Werner Peitz (independent) since 2009

Twin towns – sister cities

Delbrück is twinned with:
 Budakeszi, Hungary
 Quérénaing, France
 Zossen, Germany

Notable people
Albert Florath (1888–1957), official advisor in Delbrück, worked in the Poor, Church and School Department as well as in the police department
Martin Amedick (born 1982), footballer
Dennis Eilhoff (born 1982), footballer

Notes

References

External links

 
Paderborn (district)